Bereychiyeh-ye Sofla (also Romanized as Bereychīyeh-ye Soflá) is a village in Howmeh-ye Sharqi Rural District, in the Central District of Dasht-e Azadegan County, Khuzestan Province, Iran. At the 2006 census, its population was 446, in 91 families.

References 

Populated places in Dasht-e Azadegan County